West Virginia held elections on November 8, 2016. Elections for the United States House, as well as for several statewide offices including the governorship were held. These elections were held concurrently with the 2016 U.S. presidential election and other elections nationwide. Primary elections were held on May 10, 2016.

Federal offices

President 

Republican Donald Trump easily carried West Virginia, capturing 68.5% of the vote. Trump captured every county in the state and it was his best showing in any state.

House of Representatives 

All 3 Incumbent Republican U.S. Representatives were easily reelected, all increasing their vote share compared to 2014.

Governor 

Incumbent Democrat Earl Ray Tomblin was term-limited from running again in 2016. State Senate President Bill Cole ran unopposed in the Republican primary contest, while businessman Jim Justice defeated multiple opponents in the Democratic primary contest. The state's Republican trend, coupled with past scandals surrounding Justice's unpaid taxes and business controversies, made the race extremely competitive. Justice went on to narrowly win the election, capturing 49.1% of the vote. Justice would go on to switch party affiliation just months after being in office, announcing he would become a Republican at an August 4, 2017 rally with President Trump.

State Legislature

State Senate 
18 of the 34 State Senate seats were up for election in 2016, with 3 Democrats and 1 Republican incumbents not running for reelection. Republicans won a net gain of 4 seats, increasing their majority in the state senate from 18 to 22 seats.

House of Delegates 
All 100 seats in the West Virginia House of Delegates were up for election, with 13 Republican and 8 Democratic incumbents not running for reelection. The Republican majority sustained a net loss of 1 seat, decreasing the majority from 64 seats to 63. This soon changed when Democrat Rupert Phillips Jr. switched party affiliation to Independent in January 2017, and then to Republican in May 2017 reestablishing the 64-36 majority from 2014.

Attorney General 
Republican incumbent Patrick Morrisey successfully sought re-election, defeating State Representative Doug Reynolds, and capturing 51.63% of the vote.

Secretary of State 
Republican challenger Mac Warner defeated incumbent Democrat Natalie Tennant who had held the position since 2008. He captured 48.52% of the vote.

Treasurer 
Democratic incumbent John Perdue, who had held the West Virginia State Treasurer's position since 1996, was re-elected with 50.33% of the vote. He defeated Republican challenger and businesswoman Ann Urling. Perdue became the only Democrat to hold statewide office in West Virginia after Governor Justice's party switch in 2017.

Auditor 
Republican JB McCuskey was elected with 58.48% of the vote over Democrat Mary Ann Clayton. This marks the first time since 1928 that a Republican had won the office. The seat was open after the resignation of Democrat Glen Glainer III, who had held the office since 1992. In May 2016, Lisa Hopkins was appointed as interim Auditor until the election.

Commissioner of Agriculture 

Elected in 2012, incumbent Agriculture Commissioner Walt Helmick was defeated by Republican challenger Kent Leonhardt.

References